Luiz Gonzaga Bergonzini (20 May 1936 – 13 June 2012) was a Brazilian Roman Catholic bishop.

Ordained to the priesthood in 1959, Bergonzini was named bishop of the Roman Catholic Diocese of Guarulhos, Brazil in 1991 and retired on 23 November 2011.

References

1936 births
2012 deaths
People from São Paulo (state)
21st-century Roman Catholic bishops in Brazil
20th-century Roman Catholic bishops in Brazil
Roman Catholic bishops of Guarulhos